The  is a DC electric multiple unit (EMU) rubber-tyred metro train type operated by Sapporo Municipal Subway on the Namboku Line in the city of Sapporo, Japan, since October 1995.

Design
The trains are built by Kawasaki Heavy Industries and have aluminum bodies. Each car has four doors per side as opposed to two per side as seen on the older 2000 series and 3000 series cars. The 5000 series cars remain the only cars on the entire subway system with four doors.

The 5000 series use VVVF inverter control using insulated-gate bipolar transistor technology as opposed to the chopper control on the 3000 series and resistor control on the 2000 series, which helps to reduce power consumption and maintenance costs.

Formations
The 5000 series trains are formed as six-car sets as shown below.

Interior
Passenger accommodation consists of longitudinal bench seating throughout, with a wheelchair space in each car. The first 17 sets use LCD destination indicators; the 18th to 20th sets use LCD displays as destination indicators.

History
Built in 1995 to combat issues of platform congestion, the first 5000 series set was introduced onto the line in October 1995; a total of 17 sets were introduced from 1995 to 1999, ultimately replacing all of the 2000 series sets in service. Three more sets were introduced from 2009 to 2011 to replace the last remaining 3000 series sets at the time.

References

External links

 Order information
This article incorporates information from the corresponding article on the Japanese Wikipedia.

Electric multiple units of Japan
Sapporo Municipal Subway
Train-related introductions in 1995
750 V DC multiple units
Kawasaki multiple units